Karel Mejta (18 June 1928 – 6 November 2015) was a Czech rower who competed for Czechoslovakia in the 1952 Summer Olympics.

He was born in Třeboň. In 1952 he was a crew member of the Czechoslovak boat which won the gold medal in the coxed fours event. His son is Karel Mejta Jr.

References

1928 births
2015 deaths
Czech male rowers
Czechoslovak male rowers
Olympic rowers of Czechoslovakia
Rowers at the 1952 Summer Olympics
Olympic gold medalists for Czechoslovakia
Olympic medalists in rowing
Medalists at the 1952 Summer Olympics
People from Třeboň
European Rowing Championships medalists
Sportspeople from the South Bohemian Region